Sir Charles Fletcher Fletcher-Cooke, QC (5 May 1914 – 24 February 2001) was a British politician.

Early life
Fletcher-Cooke was born into a professional London family, though one that was financially diminished because of his father's death from wounds received in the Gallipoli Campaign.  He was the son of Charles Arthur Cooke (1883–1914) and Gwendoline May, née Bradford (1883–1977). His elder brother, Sir John Fletcher-Cooke, was MP for Southampton Test from 1964 to 1966.

He was educated at Malvern College and Peterhouse, Cambridge where he was president of the Cambridge Union in 1936. He was an Apostle and a member of the Communist Party.

He became a barrister and was called to the bar by Lincoln's Inn in 1938, becoming a King's Counsel after the war. He served in the RNVR during World War II and was a legal advisor to the British Government at the Danube Conference in 1948.

Political career
Originally a Labour Party candidate, Fletcher-Cooke contested the East Dorset seat in 1945, but lost. He joined the Conservative Party, and was elected Member of Parliament (MP) for Darwen at the 1951 general election, which he represented until the 1983 general election, when the seat was abolished in boundary changes.

Fletcher-Cooke was responsible for the creation, introduction and passage of the Suicide Act 1961, which decriminalised suicide across the United Kingdom, although he had been trying to introduce such a private member's bill before the British Parliament for over a decade beforehand. Apart from some Catholic and conservative Anglican opposition, the bill passed easily.

Fletcher-Cooke was a junior Home Office minister from 1961 to 1963 when he resigned under a shadow. Fletcher-Cooke went on to be a delegate to the Consultative Assembly of the European Council and a Member of the European Parliament from 1977 to 1979. He was knighted in 1981.

Personal life
In 1959, Fletcher-Cooke married a glamorous divorcee, Diana Westcott, former Lady Avebury. At the wedding reception, guests viewed the fact that the cake was made of cardboard as a suitable representation of the relationship between the two. They separated soon after and divorced in 1967.

In February 1963, Fletcher-Cooke had to resign his role as a junior Home Office minister after an eighteen year old borstal boy named Anthony Turner was arrested for speeding in east London. He was at the wheel of Fletcher-Cooke's Austin Princess car with his permission but without insurance or a driving licence. It transpired that Turner had been living with Fletcher-Cooke who was "looking after him" after they were introduced to each other by Robin, Viscount Maugham.

In his letter of resignation Fletcher-Cooke said that "he had been particularly concerned with the after-care of delinquents. Having been introduced to Turner ... he had duly befriended the young man and tried to help him. On reflection, he believed that this course of action had been 'well-intentioned but misguided'.".

References 

Times Guide to the House of Commons, 1966 & 1979

1914 births
2001 deaths
Alumni of Peterhouse, Cambridge
Conservative Party (UK) MEPs
Conservative Party (UK) MPs for English constituencies
Labour Party (UK) parliamentary candidates
MEPs for the United Kingdom 1973–1979
Ministers in the Macmillan and Douglas-Home governments, 1957–1964
People educated at Malvern College
Presidents of the Cambridge Union
Royal Naval Volunteer Reserve personnel of World War II
Royal Navy officers
English LGBT politicians
LGBT members of the Parliament of the United Kingdom
UK MPs 1951–1955
UK MPs 1955–1959
UK MPs 1959–1964
UK MPs 1964–1966
UK MPs 1966–1970
UK MPs 1970–1974
UK MPs 1974
UK MPs 1974–1979
UK MPs 1979–1983
20th-century LGBT people